Hamis Hatta was a Timorese politician and independence activist. He was a member of FRETILIN National Committee.

References

Fretilin politicians
Living people
Year of birth missing (living people)
Place of birth missing (living people)